Pinobee: Wings of Adventure, known in Japan as  or Pinobee: Quest of Heart, is a platformer for the Game Boy Advance, developed by Artoon and published by Hudson Soft. The game was released as a launch title for the system, on March 21, 2001 in Japan and June 11, 2001 in North America. A version was developed for PlayStation in 2002, simply titled Pinobee outside Japan.

A sequel, Pinobee & Phoebee, was released only in Japan in 2002.

Gameplay

Development and release
Pinobee: Wings of Adventure was developed by Artoon, which was founded by former Sega senior director Yoji Ishii in August 1999 with other ex-Sega staffers such as Yutaka Sugano, Naoto Ohshima, Manabu Kusunoki, and Hidetoshi Takeshita. Sugano, who co-directed and co-designed the game, stated that Ohshima conceived the game as a story that expressed the growth of the human heart. The story about a robotic bee brought to life by a grandfatherly scientist was inspired by the fantasy novel The Adventures of Pinocchio. The game's original main theme was that of the love between a parent and child, but this was eventually toned down. Ishii claimed that the transition from Sega platforms to the GBA and the game's development were smooth due to the handheld's 32-bit CPU and C-based programming. The new GBA hardware presented a unique challenge for the project team and was chosen as the best fit to represent the game's art style. The characters were created using pre-rendered CG models while the backgrounds were hand-drawn. The CG models differed little from their initial concepts, although the antagonists changed from living insects to robots. The game's world map was modeled after the Vincent van Gogh oil painting series Langlois Bridge at Arles.

Leading up to the release of Pinobee, it was shown at Nintendo Space World, the European Computer Trade Show, Jump Festa, and the Tokyo Game Show. The game was published by Hudson Soft as a launch title for the GBA in Japan on March 21, 2001. A software bug that softlocks the game in two instances was found by consumers shortly thereafter. A workaround for the bug and an apology was posted by Hudson on its official Japanese website on April 11, 2001. Activision struck an overseas distribution deal with Hudson to release Pinobee alongside the GBA in North America and Europe on June 11 and June 22, 2001 respectively. Artoon and Hudson collaborated on a sequel titled Pinobee & Phoebee, released in Japan for the GBA on July 18, 2002. The game gives players the ability to switch between the titular brother-sister duo, each with unique abilities, in search of 20 heart pieces in every stage. Ohshima said Hudson suggested Pinobee could be enjoyable as a PlayStation game and a port of the original game was developed for it. Hudson began advertising both the port of Pinobee and the GBA release of Pinobee & Phoebee (including English language promotional artwork for the sequel) on its North American website in 2002. Konami acquired the distribution rights to the Pinobee series and displayed both games at its E3 booth in May 2002. Hudson released the PlayStation port of Pinobee in Japan in September 2002 while Konami handled its release in North America and Europe in 2003. Pinobee & Phoebee remained exclusive to Japan.

Reception

The Game Boy Advance version received "mixed" reviews according to the review aggregation website Metacritic. NextGen called it "A cute but ultimately underachieving entry in an already crowded market." In Japan, Famitsu gave it a score of 25 out of 40 for the GBA original, and 27 out of 40 for the PlayStation version.

References

External links
PINOBEE（ARTOON） - Internet Archive

2001 video games
Activision games
Artoon games
Fictional bees
Game Boy Advance games
Hudson Soft games
Konami games
Platform games
PlayStation (console) games
Video games about insects
Video games developed in Japan
Video games with alternate endings
Video games with pre-rendered 3D graphics
Works based on The Adventures of Pinocchio
Single-player video games